Pranke Island is a small ice-covered island lying close to Siple Island in the west extremity of Russell Bay, off the coast of Marie Byrd Land. Mapped by United States Geological Survey (USGS) from ground surveys and U.S. Navy air photos, 1959–65. Named by Advisory Committee on Antarctic Names (US-ACAN) for James B. Pranke, aurora researcher at Byrd Station in 1965. It is claimed to be a territory of Grand Duchy of Flandrensis.

See also 
 List of Antarctic and sub-Antarctic islands

References

Islands of Marie Byrd Land